The 2013 Mid-American Conference football season was the 68th season for the Mid-American Conference (MAC). The University of Massachusetts who joined the conference the previous season would now be eligible for the conference championship as well as bowl games. Last season at the Marathon MAC Championship game, Northern Illinois defeated Kent State 44–37 for the championship.

Previous season